Rural Heritage is a bimonthly magazine published for America's past and present enthusiasts of animal power.

History and profile
First published in 1976, the magazine was named The Evener. It serves small farmers and loggers who use draft horses, mules, and oxen in their business. The former headquarters was in Gainesboro, Tennessee. The headquarters of the magazine is in Cedar Rapids, Iowa. It is self-published on a small Iowa farm and distributes its issues mainly through direct mailing.  Some farm and feed stores such as Tractor Supply also carry the magazine. Rural Heritage is currently edited by Joe Mischka.  Previously, the magazine was edited by Gail Damerow.

References

External links 
 

1976 establishments in Iowa
Agricultural magazines
Bimonthly magazines published in the United States
Lifestyle magazines published in the United States
Equine magazines published in Kentucky
Magazines established in 1976
Magazines published in Iowa
Magazines published in Tennessee
Mass media in Cedar Rapids, Iowa
Mass media in Knoxville, Tennessee
Rural society in the United States